Five Star Hospital is a 1997 Indian Malayalam-language drama film directed by Thaha. The film stars George Vishnu, Jagadish, Jagathy Sreekumar, and Thilakan. The film has musical score by Bombay Ravi.

Plot 
The film is about Rafael, a new singer in the Malayalam film industry. It starts off by showing the current situation of government hospitals and the situation of private hospitals. N.F. Varghese plays Nambiar, a doctor who prescribes any and every test for his patients, whether dead or alive. Adipoli Ayeemutti, played by Jagadish is a troupe owner. Rafael works with him. He brings Rafael to MKM Hospital where Nambiar works. Rafael is admitted to the hospital under the fake name of O. Joseph. Nambiar prescribes many tests for Rafael. That is when he meets Dr. Sethulakshmi, who Nambiar has an issue with.

In flashbacks, it is shown that Rafael is the son of Carlos, a butcher. Rafael, however, doesn't like meat or killing animals. Father of the church brings a solution for Rafael who loves to sing by employing him at the church choir. The story takes a turn when Rafael finds out that he is adopted. How Rafael finds out about his true parents, in which Sethulakshmi is his biological mother, and understands the tactics employed by Varma to kill Rafael is what the story is about.

Cast 

George Vishnu as Rafael 
Jagadish as Adipoli Aymooti
Jagathy Sreekumar
Thilakan as Carlos
Sukumari
Kalpana as Snehalatha 
Devan as Varma 
Geetha as Sethulakhshmi
Kaveri
Mala Aravindan
N. F. Varghese as Nambiar 
Job Pottas as Hospital Administrator

Soundtrack
The music was composed by Bombay Ravi and the lyrics were written by Yusufali Kechery.

References

External links
 

1997 films
1990s Malayalam-language films
Films scored by Ravi